Statistics of League of Ireland in the 1957/1958 season.

Overview
It was contested by 12 teams, and Drumcondra F.C. won the championship and qualified to play in the European Cup for next season.

Final classification

Results

Top scorers

Ireland
1957–58 in Republic of Ireland association football
League of Ireland seasons